The 2018 Campeonato Nacional de Fútbol de Cuba is the 107th season of the top-tier football league in Cuba. The season began on 19 February and ended on 30 June 2018.

Group stage

Group A

Group B

Group C

Final stage

References

Campeonato Nacional de Fútbol de Cuba seasons
Cuba
Cuba
football